Bryan Allen Craig (born October 27, 1991) is an American actor. He is best known for playing Morgan Corinthos in the soap opera General Hospital.

Early life
Craig was born in Boca Raton, Florida, in 1991 to Lissett Craig & Donnie Craig, he has a younger brother named Bradley Allen Craig. His first acting role was at age fourteen in the 2005 movie Off the Chain. He later left Florida to pursue an acting career in Los Angeles.

Career
After moving to Los Angeles, Craig was cast as Justin in the 2011 film Christmas Spirit. He next appeared on The Nine Lives of Chloe King in 2011, and had a recurring role on Bucket & Skinner's Epic Adventures from 2011 to 2012.

On April 17, 2013, ABC confirmed that Craig had been cast in the role of Morgan Corinthos on General Hospital. He began taping his first scenes on April 15. Craig later told Soap Opera Digest that he was hesitant to do a soap. However, the role of Morgan changed his mind about daytime. It was his parents who convinced him to sign a three-year contract. Angela Durrell of TV Source described the character of Morgan as "[s]ensitive and emotionally wounded." Morgan craves "strong ties" and stability. Mara Levinsky described Craig's Morgan as "impulsive" and "imperfect." Michael Logan described Craig's Morgan as a "marvelous muddle of puppy awkwardness and testy testosterone." When asked about his character's "casual and low-key," wardrobe, despite his family being filthy rich, Craig said Morgan is all about quick cash, but "far from snooty." He is the kind of guy that sleeps all day, and eats pizza for breakfast. His sense of style reflects his laid back personality. Susan Hornik described Craig's Morgan as a "Prince Harry-esque, bad boy." Since taking on the role of Morgan, Craig has been nominated at the Daytime Emmy Awards in the category of Outstanding Younger Actor in a Drama Series, and won the award in 2016. On September 15, 2016, Craig announced via Instagram that he had decided to exit the series.

After leaving General Hospital, Craig appeared in the recurring role of Sgt Adam Coogan in The CW series Valor from 2017 to 2018. In 2019, he began starring as Javi Mendoza in the ABC drama Grand Hotel.

Personal life
Craig was previously engaged to his General Hospital'' co-star Kelly Thiebaud.

Filmography

Film

Television

Awards and nominations

References

External links

 
 
 
 Byan Craig at TV.com
 Bryan Craig at Soap Opera Network

1991 births
Living people
American male film actors
American male television actors
Male actors from Florida
American male soap opera actors
Daytime Emmy Award winners
Daytime Emmy Award for Outstanding Younger Actor in a Drama Series winners